Fritz Posselt was a Czechoslovakian luger who competed in the late 1920s. He won a bronze medal in the men's doubles event at the 1928 European championships in Schreiberhau, Germany (now Szklarska Poręba, Poland).

References
List of European luge champions 

Czechoslovak male lugers
Year of birth missing
Year of death missing
German Bohemian people
Czechoslovak people of German descent